Thea Weis (1924–1999) was an Austrian stage and film actress.

Selected filmography
 Invitation to the Dance (1941)
 Whom the Gods Love (1942)
 Music in Salzburg (1944)
 Professor Nachtfalter (1951)

References

Bibliography
 Robert Dassanowsky. Austrian Cinema: A History. McFarland, 2005.

External links

1924 births
1999 deaths
Austrian film actresses
20th-century Austrian actresses
Austrian stage actresses
Actresses from Vienna